Daniel Trombley Ingram (September 7, 1934 – June 24, 2018) was an American Top 40 radio disc jockey with a 50-year career on radio stations such as WABC and WCBS-FM in New York City.

Career

"Big Dan"  started broadcasting at WHCH Hofstra College, Hempstead; WNRC, New Rochelle; and WALK-FM, Patchogue, all in New York State.

Ingram was one of the most highly regarded DJs from his era. He was noted for his quick wit and ability to convey a humorous or satiric idea with fast pacing and an economy of words, a skill that rendered him uniquely suited to, and successful within, modern personality-driven music radio. He was among the most frequently emulated radio personalities, cited as an influence or inspiration by numerous current broadcasters. One of Ingram's unique skills was his ability to "talk up" to the lyrics of a record, meaning speaking over the musical introduction and finishing exactly at the point when the lyrics started.

Ingram was well known for playing doctored versions of popular songs. The Paul McCartney and Wings lyrics "My Love Does it Good" from "My Love" became "My Glove Does it Good". The stuttering title refrain of Elton John's "Bennie and the Jets" went from three or four repetitions to countless. In the same vein, the distinctive refrain added to "Hooked on a Feeling" by Blue Swede, "Ooga-chucka-ooga-ooga" would start repeating and listeners would never know when it would end. Paul Simon's "50 Ways to Leave Your Lover" became "50 Ways to Love Your Leaver" and "49 Ways to Relieve Your Liver", and Ingram  "rearranged" the spelling of "S-A-T-U-R-D-A-Y" on the Bay City Rollers' "Saturday Night". He had a daily "Honor Group of the Day" (for example, cops on the beat), and a "Word of the Day" (such as humdinger).

His longtime closing theme song was "Tri-Fi Drums" by Billy May. An edited version of the song was used for broadcast.

TV commercials Ingram narrated include a 1970 promo for free cut-out records of Archies songs on the backs of Post Honeycomb and Alpha-Bits cereals. Ingram also worked for cable channel HBO in the mid-1980s, mostly as the off-camera host of HBO Coming Attractions (a monthly show featuring previews of HBO's upcoming programming; occasionally he would co-host with another HBO voice, Joyce Gordon) and various voiceover roles, though he did occasionally appear on camera in early 1986 as part of the HBO Weekend interstitials of the time.

Ingram was also featured prominently in his son Chris's book, Hey Kemosabe! The Days (and Nights) of a Radio Idyll, a fictionalized account of the Musicradio WABC era.

On air history

 1958: WICC, Bridgeport, Connecticut (under the name Rae Tayler)
 1958: WNHC, New Haven, Connecticut
 1959: KBOX, Dallas, Texas
 1959-1960: WIL, St. Louis, Missouri
 July 3, 1961-May 10, 1982: WABC, New York City. He and Ron Lundy were on-air as the station switched to TalkRadio.
 April 1984-December 1986: Hosted CBS Radio's Top 40 Satellite Survey (aired on 118 stations across the United States as of March 1985).
 1984-June 1985: WKTU (92.3 FM), New York City
 1986-1987: announcer for Nightlife, a late-night TV talk show hosted by David Brenner
 1987-1988: The Weekend Music Review, a weekly Adult Contemporary radio program that counted down the top 20 AC records today, and highlighted what was going on 20, 15, 10, and 1 yr ago that weekend. JAM Creative Productions, Dallas produced and syndicated from 1987 to 1988. Julie Sizemore handled affiliate relations. Dan Ingram was host of "The Weekend Music Review" 3 hour AC show.
 October 1991-June 2003, September 16, 2007: New York Radio Greats on WCBS-FM, New York City
 June 1998: KRTH, Los Angeles. One week as "guest DJ," ostensibly a tryout for the morning drive spot previously held by Robert W. Morgan, who had died a month earlier. The job went to Charlie Van Dyke. 
 February 8, 2004: Fab-40th Weekend on WAXQ, New York

Personal life
Ingram had been diagnosed with Parkinsonian syndrome in 2014, and died after choking while eating. Upon his death, Ingram was survived by his wife, Maureen Donnelly. He also had five sons (Christopher, Daniel, David, Robert, and Phillip), four daughters (Patricia, Michelle, Christina, and Jacqueline), two stepdaughters (Laura and Linda), 26 grandchildren, and 12 great-grandchildren.

His brother was John W. Ingram, who was the final president of the Chicago, Rock Island and Pacific Railroad when the company went bankrupt on March 31, 1980.

References

External links
 Musicradio77.com
 Musicradio 77 tribute page featuring pictures of Ingram and Lundy broadcasting their last radio show before the music died.

1934 births
2018 deaths
American radio DJs
Radio personalities from New York City
Hofstra University alumni
People from Oceanside, New York
Deaths from dementia in Florida